The Abbot of Coupar Angus (later Commendator of Coupar) was the head of the monastic community and lands of Coupar Angus Abbey, on the boundary between Angus and Gowrie in Scotland.  The abbot David Bane (David Bayn) was granted the mitre in 1464.  The following are a list of abbots and commendators. 


List of abbots
 Fulk, x1164-1170
 Ralph, 1171-1189
 Adam, 1189-1194
 Arnold, 1194-x1201
 William (I), 1201-1202
 Udard, 1202-1207
 Richard, 1207-1209
 Alexander, 1209-1240
 Gilbert, 1240-1243
 William de Binin, 1243-1258
 William (III), 1258-1283
 Andreas de Buchan, 1284-1296
 Alan, x1300-1315x
 John Orwell, x1325-1341x1356
 Lambert, fl. 1356
 Walter, fl. 1387 
 John de Ketnes, x1395-1419
 William de Ledhuys (Ledhouse), 1419-x1428
 Thomas de Furde, x1428-1429
 William de Blare, 1429-1453x1456
 Thomas de Levingstone, 1456-1459
 John de Hudton, 1460-1461
 David Bane, 1461-1479x1483
 John Schanwell, 1479x1483-1506
 Robert Beaton, 1507
 William Turnbull, 1507-1524
 William Stewart, 1511-1512
 Thomas Hay, 1524-1525
 John (Alexander) Spens, 1524-1526 (elect only)
 Donald Campbell 1526-1562/3

List of commendators
 Leonard Leslie (I), 1563-1602
 George Foullertoun the Younger of Dunune, 1594
 Leonard Leslie (II), 1596-1598
 Andrew Lamb, 1603-1607
 Patrick Stirling, 1607
 James Elphinstone, 1606-1607

Notes

Bibliography
 Cowan, Ian B. & Easson, David E., Medieval Religious Houses: Scotland With an Appendix on the Houses in the Isle of Man, Second edition, (London, 1976), pp. 73–4
 Easson, D. E., Charters of the Abbey of Coupar Angus, 2 vols., Publications of the Scottish History Society. 3rd series ; v. 40-41, (Edinburgh, 1947)
 Watt, D. E. R. & Shead, N. F. (eds.), The Heads of Religious Houses in Scotland from the 12th to the 16th Centuries, The Scottish Records Society, New Series, Volume 24, (Edinburgh, 2001), pp. 43–7

Cistercian abbots by monastery
Scottish abbots
Lists of abbots
Abbot of